John Weyhing (June 24, 1869 – June 20, 1890) was a left-handed pitcher who played for the Cincinnati Red Stockings in 1888 and Columbus Solons in 1889. The brother of pitcher Gus Weyhing, he died four days before his 21st birthday.

He made his debut on July 13, 1888 at the age of 19 – the third youngest player in the league. In eight games that year, he went 3-4 with a 1.23 ERA and seven complete games. He pitched 65 innings, allowing 52 hits and 17 walks while striking out 30 batters. Though he gave up 26 runs, only nine of them were earned.

On December 14, 1888, he was purchased by the Solons from the Red Stockings.

In 1889, he appeared in only one game, which would prove to be the final game of his career. On April 20, he pitched one inning, allowing three runs for a 27.00 ERA. He contracted tuberculosis, prematurely ending his career and life.

Overall, Weyhing pitched in nine big league games, starting eight of them. He went 3-4 with a 1.62 ERA.

References

1869 births
1890 deaths
Cincinnati Red Stockings (AA) players
Columbus Solons players
Baseball players from Louisville, Kentucky
19th-century deaths from tuberculosis
Tuberculosis deaths in Kentucky